Ait Junction railway station (station code AIT) is a small railway station located in Jalaun, Konch in the Indian state of Uttar Pradesh. Nearby major railway station is Jhansi Jn and the airport is Gwalior Airport. It belongs to North Central, Jhansi Jn.

Major trains 
 Konch Ait Passenger
 Ait Konch Passenger
 Kanpur–Jhansi Passenger
 Lucknow–Jhansi Passenger
 Panchvalley Passenger Slip 2 
 Sabarmati Express 
 Jhansi–Lucknow Passenger
 Kushinagar Express  
 Gwalior–Barauni Mail
 Rishikesh–Bandikui Passenger
Jhansi–Lucknow Intercity Express
Lucknow–Jhansi Intercity Express

See also

 Northern Railway zone
 Ait, Uttar Pradesh

References 

Railway stations in Agra district
Railway stations in Jhansi district
Jhansi railway division